The 1999 Pilot Pen Tennis was a women's tennis tournament played on outdoor hard courts in New Haven in the United States. It was part of Tier II of the 1999 WTA Tour. The tournament was held from August 23 through August 29, 1999. Second-seeded Venus Williams won the singles title.

Entrants

Seeds

Other entrants
The following players received wildcards into the singles main draw:
  Tara Snyder
  Lilia Osterloh

The following players received wildcards into the doubles main draw:
  Tara Snyder /  Alexandra Stevenson

The following players received entry from the singles qualifying draw:

  Tatiana Panova
  Květa Hrdličková
  Ángeles Montolio
  Barbara Schwartz
  Amélie Cocheteux
  Sabine Appelmans
  Magüi Serna
  María Sánchez Lorenzo

Finals

Singles

 Venus Williams defeated  Lindsay Davenport, 6–2, 7–5
 This was Williams' fifth title of the year.

Doubles

 Lisa Raymond /  Rennae Stubbs defeated  Elena Likhovtseva /  Jana Novotná, 7–6(7–1), 6–2

External links
 ITF singles results page
 WTA draw archive

Pilot Pen Tennis
Connecticut Open (tennis)
 
Pilot Pen Tennis
Pilot Pen Tennis